Walter Allievi (born 14 January 1960 in Seveso) is a retired Italian professional football player. He played in the Serie A for A.S. Roma in two seasons (1978/79, 1981/82) for a total of 27 games and 2 goals.

References

1960 births
Living people
Italian footballers
Serie A players
A.S. Roma players
Parma Calcio 1913 players
Alma Juventus Fano 1906 players
A.C. Perugia Calcio players
Catania S.S.D. players
S.S. Arezzo players
A.S.D. SolbiaSommese Calcio players
U.S. 1913 Seregno Calcio players
Association football midfielders
A.C. Meda 1913 players
S.G. Gallaratese A.S.D. players